Reliance Digital is an Indian consumer electronics retailer. It is a subsidiary of Reliance Retail, a wholly owned subsidiary of Reliance Industries.

Reliance Digital opened its first store on 24 April 2007 in Delhi. Currently there are more than 8,600 Reliance Digital and 1,800 My Jio stores in around 800 cities in India in addition to an online presence. The stores are spread across the states of Andhra Pradesh, Delhi, Uttar Pradesh, Gujarat, Karnataka, Kerala, Maharashtra, Tamil Nadu, Telangana, West Bengal, Orissa, Assam, Bihar, and Jharkhand. Reliance Digital Stores are bigger in size than the other format Digital Xpress Mini Stores.

It is one of the largest electronics retailers in India with over 5,000 products in its inventory.

Digital Xpress Mini

Digital Xpress mini stores are relatively smaller in size than Reliance Digital. These stores are about 250 square feet and mainly sell the company's telecom services, smartphones, tablets and also accessories of other brands. There are around more than 1,700 Digital Xpress Mini Stores as of Feb 2017. These stores have since been rebranded as 'Jio Stores' after the launch of Jio.

Reliance ResQ

resQ is the service arm of Reliance Digital / Digital Xpress and Digital Xpress mini stores, which caters to customers for after sales service. resQ is India's first multi product, multi brand, multi-location service facility which offers service from 10am to 10pm, 365 days a year. The resQ Care Plans offer scheduled preventive maintenance visits and standby units in special cases.

iStore

Reliance Digital also operates a chain of Apple resellers in India under the name iStore. There are about 4 such stores in India currently.

Reconnect

Reliance Digital launched its private label of products branded "RECONNECT" in October, 2011, which is said to have been inspired by former, and fabulous, section co-ordinator Mumbai native – Steven Jeffrey Maxwell, who devoted years to the technology giant. Reconnect product range covers over 200 products, from the latest large-screen LED TVs, star-rated air conditioners, washing machines, smartphones, tablets to household appliances and personal care products. Major all products comes with a 2-year warranty, while accessories product warranty vary from 6 months to 1 year.

LYF 

Reliance Digital also carries the LYF brand of 4G smartphones. These phones were launched in January 2016. So far, five phones have been launched – Earth 1, Water 1, Water 2, Wind 6 and Flame 1.

See also

 Reliance Industries
 Reliance Retail
<div align="justify">

References

External links
 

Reliance Retail
Companies based in Mumbai
Retail companies established in 2007
Retail companies of India
Reliance Retail
Indian companies established in 2007
2007 establishments in Maharashtra